Xenia is a 2014 drama film directed by Panos H. Koutras. It was selected to compete in the Un Certain Regard section at the 2014 Cannes Film Festival, and in the Contemporary World Cinema section at the 2014 Toronto International Film Festival. It was the Greek entry for the Best Foreign Language Film award at the 88th Academy Awards but it was not nominated.

Plot
The film is about two brothers, Dany, 15, who is gay, and Odysseas (Ody), 18. Their mother, an Albanian singer, has recently died. Facing the threat of deportation, the brothers go on a road trip from Athens to Thessaloniki looking for their Greek father, and with him the possibility of gaining Greek citizenship. They are obsessed with the songs of the Italian singer Patty Pravo, and Ody, who has a good voice, plans to sing one of her songs in a talent contest.

Cast
 Kostas Nikouli as Dany 
 Nikos Gelia as Odysseas 
 Yannis Stankoglou as Lefteris 
 Marissa Triandafyllidou as Vivi 
 Aggelos Papadimitriou as Tassos 	
 Romanna Lobats as Maria-Sonia 	
 Patty Pravo as herself
 Ioulios Tziatas as Moustafa

See also
 List of submissions to the 88th Academy Awards for Best Foreign Language Film
 List of Greek submissions for the Academy Award for Best Foreign Language Film

References

External links
 
 
 
 

2014 films
2014 drama films
Greek drama films
2010s Greek-language films
Greek LGBT-related films
Films set in Greece
Films shot in Athens
Films shot in Crete
Albanian-language films
French drama films
Belgian drama films
LGBT-related drama films
Gay-related films
2014 LGBT-related films
2014 multilingual films
Greek multilingual films
French multilingual films
Belgian multilingual films
2010s French films